Hornitos are conical, or pipe-like, structures built up by lava spattering or being ejected through an opening in the crust of a lava flow. Hornitos are similar to spatter cones but are rootless, meaning they were once a source of lava but that source was not directly associated with a true vent or magma source. They are usually created by the slow upwelling of fluid lava through the roof of a lava tube, and are often associated with pahoehoe lavas of basaltic composition.  High pressure causes lava to ooze and spatter out. The lava builds up on the surface and solidifies creating the initial structure. Hornitos can grow and exceed 10 meters in height.

Some classic examples of hornitos have been described, or depicted, from volcanoes including El Jorullo, Mexico which was visited by Alexander von Humboldt in 1803; Kilauea Hawaii; and Oldoinyo Lengai, Tanzania.  

The term hornito comes from the Spanish, meaning 'little oven'; a reference to the way that hornitos might appear to 'smoke' when they are active.

References

External links
Video of Hornito

Volcanic landforms